
Gmina Poniatowa is an urban-rural gmina (administrative district) in Opole Lubelskie County, Lublin Voivodeship, in eastern Poland.

Villages
Apart from the town of Poniatowa, Gmina Poniatowa contains the villages and settlements of Dąbrowa Wronowska, Henin, Kocianów, Kowala Druga, Kowala Pierwsza, Kraczewice Prywatne, Kraczewice Rządowe, Niezabitów, Niezabitów-Kolonia, Obliźniak, Plizin, Poniatowa-Kolonia, Poniatowa-Wieś, Spławy, Szczuczki-Kolonia, Wólka Łubkowska and Zofianka.

Neighbouring gminas
Gmina Poniatowa is bordered by the gminas of Bełżyce, Chodel, Karczmiska, Opole Lubelskie, Wąwolnica and Wojciechów.

References

Polish official population figures 2006

Poniatowa
Opole Lubelskie County